Selhurst is a ward in the London Borough of Croydon. The ward had 3 councillors between 2002 and 2018, but from May 3, 2018, the ward has been reduced in size, and reduced to two councillors.

List of Councillors

Mayoral election results 
Below are the results for the candidate which received the highest share of the popular vote in the ward at each mayoral election.

Ward Results 

The by-election was triggered by the death of Councillor Gerry Ryan.

References 

Wards of the London Borough of Croydon